Laurence Anyways is a 2012 Canadian romantic drama film written, directed and edited by Xavier Dolan. The film competed in the Un Certain Regard section at the 2012 Cannes Film Festival where Suzanne Clément won the Un Certain Regard Award for Best Actress. Laurence Anyways also won the Queer Palm Award at the festival.

At the 2012 Toronto International Film Festival, Laurence Anyways won the award for Best Canadian Feature Film. The film also received ten nominations at the 1st Canadian Screen Awards, including Best Motion Picture, Best Direction for Dolan, Best Actor in a Leading Role for Poupaud, Best Actress in a Leading Role for Clément, and Best Screenplay for Dolan.

Plot
The film begins by introducing 35-year old Laurence Alia (Melvil Poupaud), an award-winning novelist and literature teacher in Montreal, Quebec. Laurence is very much in love with his girlfriend, the fiery and passionate Frédérique - "Fred" - Bellair (Suzanne Clément). On the day of Fred's birthday, Laurence reveals to Fred his biggest secret; he has felt his entire life that he was born in the wrong body and says that he has been living a lie for so many years. He wishes to rectify the situation and restart his life as a woman. Fred accuses him of being gay and takes the news very hard.

They separate for a short time, but Fred arrives at the conclusion, much to the chagrin of her mother and sister, that she must be there for Laurence. Their romance resumes and Fred becomes Laurence's biggest supporter. Fred teaches Laurence how to do her own makeup and buys her a wig. She urges Laurence to dress as her true self, in female clothing. Laurence shows up to work one day in a dress. All seemingly goes well until the school board fires her from her position at the school due to the negative reception of her transition. Fred, suffering from career disappointments and a surprise pregnancy that she quietly chooses to abort, falls into a state of depression and eventually leaves Laurence and moves away. Fred marries a man, Albert, and has a son named Leo.

Five years later, Laurence, although living with and romantically engaged with Charlotte, is still deeply in love with Fred. She stalks her regularly, often driving and parking outside of her house in Trois-Rivières. After publishing her book of poems, she sends a copy to Fred, who decodes the poems' secret message meant for her. She contacts Laurence, and the two meet and run away to the Isle of Black. However, the romantic getaway turns sour and the two argue. Fred reveals she was pregnant when Laurence revealed her gender identity, and Fred had an abortion. Fred's husband learns her whereabouts from Charlotte and Fred's relationship and life with him is shattered. Laurence leaves Fred in the night and the two do not speak for several years.

Whilst Laurence is being interviewed for her biography, the interviewer inquires about Fred, after having listened to the couple's story. Laurence admits that she recently reconnected with Fred, newly divorced, but their meeting did not go well. She tells the interviewer that she has chosen to age as a woman. The final scene shows the circumstances under which Fred and Laurence first met, on a commercial set, Laurence having been bet to talk to Fred.

Cast

 Melvil Poupaud as Laurence Alia
 Suzanne Clément as Frédérique "Fred" Bellair
 Nathalie Baye as Julienne Alia
 Monia Chokri as Stéfie Bellair
 Susie Almgren as Journalist
 Yves Jacques as Michel Lafortune
 Anne-Élisabeth Bossé as Mélanie
 Anne Dorval as Marthe Delteuil
 Sophie Faucher as Andrée Bellair
 Magalie Lépine-Blondeau as Charlotte
 David Savard as Albert
 Catherine Bégin as Mama Rose
 Emmanuel Schwartz as Baby Rose
 Jacques Lavallée as Dada Rose
 Perette Souplex as Tatie Rose
 Patricia Tulasne as Shookie Rose
 Éric Bruneau as Mathieu

Production
Director Xavier Dolan was inspired to write Laurence Anyways upon hearing of the story of Luce Baillargé. At the time, Dolan was unaware his producer, Lyse Lafontaine, had been Baillargé's girlfriend and that they had a son, Mikaël. Lafontaine sought the consent of Baillargé and Baillargé's children before making the film.

Melvil Poupaud took the role of Laurence. Despite not being familiar with Dolan's filmography, Poupaud found Dolan to be an interesting character, and said he was hoping for such a role in his acting career.

Baillargé died of a heart attack before Laurence Anyways was completed and released. It is dedicated to her.

Release and reception
Laurence Anyways was released in the United Kingdom by Network Releasing. It was theatrically released on 30 November 2012, and on DVD on 25 March 2013. The film was released theatrically in the United States on 28 June 2013 by Breaking Glass Pictures and was released on DVD and Blu-ray on 8 October 2013.

Laurence Anyways received mostly positive reviews from critics. It holds an approval rating of 84% percent  based on 62 reviews in the film critics website Rotten Tomatoes, with the general consensus being "Passionate and powerfully acted, Laurence Anyways sometimes strains to achieve its narrative ambitions (and fill its three-hour running time), but ultimately succeeds." The average rating is 7/10.

Accolades

References

External links
 
 
 

2012 films
2012 romantic drama films
2012 LGBT-related films
Canadian romantic drama films
Canadian LGBT-related films
Films directed by Xavier Dolan
Lesbian-related films
LGBT-related romantic drama films
Queer Palm winners
Films about trans women
French-language Canadian films
Films set in Montreal
2010s Canadian films